Stephen Silver (born August 30, 1972) is a British artist, cartoonist and character designer.  He is best known as the lead character designer for animated series such as Kim Possible and Danny Phantom.

History
Silver started his professional career by drawing caricatures at amusement parks in 1992. He worked for clothing company No Fear in 1996, before he got his first job in animation at Warner Bros. Animation in 1997.

Animated works

In the field of animation, Silver is the lead character designer on Disney Channel's Kim Possible, ABC TV's Clerks: The Animated Series, and Nickelodeon's Danny Phantom (on which he was also art director).

His character designs for the characters of Clerks: The Animated Series inspired the animated versions of characters in the other View Askew films.

He also worked on Nickelodeon's The Fairly OddParents as the lead character designer for the Crash Nebula episode special, and some character designs for the movie Channel Chasers.  His early work in animation included designing characters for Histeria.

Portfolio

References

External links

Silvertoons - Silver's website.
Silver's blog at Blogspot.
Official Facebook Page

American cartoonists
American animators
British emigrants to the United States
English animators
English cartoonists
Artists from London
1972 births
Living people
American storyboard artists
Prop designers
American production designers
British production designers